P. R. Siva is an Independent politician from India. He was elected as a member of the Puducherry Legislative Assembly from Thirunallar (constituency). He defeated S. Rajasekaran of Bharatiya Janata Party by 1,380 votes in 2021 Puducherry Assembly election.

References 

Living people
Year of birth missing (living people)
21st-century Indian politicians
People from Karaikal district
Independent politicians in India
All India NR Congress politicians
Puducherry MLAs 2021–2026